{{DISPLAYTITLE:C9H12O2}}
The molecular formula C9H12O2 (molar mass: 152.18 g/mol, exact mass: 152.0837 u) may refer to:

 Cumene hydroperoxide (CHP)
 4-Ethylguaiacol
 Lanierone

Molecular formulas